Oliver Cooper (born December 2, 1989) is an American actor. He is best known for his roles as Costa in the 2012 comedy film Project X, as Levon on the comedy-drama series Californication, as Wheeler on the cult Amazon series Red Oaks and as David Berkowitz (a.k.a. "The Son of Sam") on the critically-acclaimed Netflix series Mindhunter.

Early life
Cooper was born in Sylvania Township, Ohio, where he attended Sylvania Northview High School. He grew up with his parents, Wendy and Mike, and two older siblings, a brother (Jason) and a sister (Nikki). At age 17, Cooper performed stand up comedy in Toledo, Ohio. After high school, he attended Arizona State University for one year. He then dropped out of college to pursue his acting career in Los Angeles. Cooper is Jewish.

Career
At the age of 20, Cooper was offered one of the lead roles in the film Project X. He, Thomas Mann and Jonathan Daniel Brown were three unknown actors when cast in the film. However, Mann had a role in the indie film It's Kind of a Funny Story. Cooper got the audition because of his friend, Shaun Weiss. In addition, for his role in Project X, he was nominated for two MTV awards.

In 2013, he appeared in the film Runner, Runner.

In 2019 he appeared in the second season of the Netflix series Mindhunter as serial killer David Berkowitz.

Personal life
Cooper's inspirations are Bill Murray, Robin Williams and John Goodman. Cooper lived with his aunt and her four dogs in Encino when he moved to LA. Cooper is 5’7”.

Filmography

Film

Television

Web series

Awards and nominations

References

External links
 

Living people
20th-century American Jews
American male film actors
21st-century American Jews
Jewish American male actors
Male actors from Toledo, Ohio
1989 births
21st-century American actors
Male actors from Ohio